Pachucas (from pachuca, the female counterpart to the pachuco) were Mexican American women who wore zoot suits during World War II, also known as "cholitas", "slick chicks", and "lady zoot suiters". The suit was a symbol of rebellion due to the rationing of cloth for the war effort. Wearing the longer and loose-fitting jackets and pants was therefore seen as being unpatriotic. The zoot suit was the most salient identifying feature of "pachuquismo", a Mexican American youth subculture. This subculture emerged during a time of increased racism and the fight for Mexican American rights and equality within American society. Both men and women wore the fingertip coats, but for women it became more than just a style. Pachuca gangs, like the Black Widows and Slick Chicks, with their black drape jackets, tight skirts, fishnet stockings and heavily emphasized make-up, were ridiculed in the press. This was not just the case for pachuca women in gangs, but pachuca women in general. Participation in the movement was a way to openly challenge conventional notions of feminine beauty and sexuality, especially in Mexican culture.

Zoot Suit Riots 
Las Pachucas or 'cholitas' were the female counterpart to the male zoot suiter, or pachuco. Las Pachucas were involved in much of the violence surrounding the Zoot Suit Riots, often in documentation being seen throwing things and yelling at law enforcement. Las Pachucas were unique in relation to their pachuco counterpart because of their newfound sexual and cultural identity, within both their own Mexican American communities and American society. Las Pachucas feminized the masculine style of dress by wearing, in addition to the coats, sheer blouses, shorter, pleated skirts, fishnet stockings or bobby socks, platform heels or sandals. Their use of make-up and beauty products was another identifying feature, as they wore dark lipstick and used foam inserts called rats to lift their hair up into a high bouffant/up do, and most often sported plucked and thin eye brows. Las Pachucas became a figure for Mexican American femininity and sexuality during the time of WWII and the Zoot suit riots due to their change in dress and use of make up that stood in stark contrast to previous conventional ideals within Mexican culture.

Background 
For some, during the time of WWII the wearing of the pachuca style was a statement to the communities of their identity, for others it was a symbol of rebellion. The emergence of the coverage and documentation of Las Pachucas, as well as "the appearance of female pachucos coincided with a dramatic rise in the delinquency rates amongst girls aged between 12 and 20 years old" after the Sleepy Lagoon Case. During the case, Pachuca women were involved and like their pachuco counterparts were not given due process. During the time of increased discrimination against Mexican Americans and Mexican culture, this inclusion of Pachuca women complicates their potential status as "patriotic Americans". Pachuca women face both backlash from their own communities for their newly sexualized styles and contributions to the riots, but also the Anglo communities and they felt that pachuca women were "unfeminine," and could never conform to or exude Anglo standards of feminine beauty due to their involvement in the movement.

Reactions

In the media 
In the Los Angeles newspapers “las pachucas were vilified as incorrigible delinquents.” Similarly, “La Opinion referred to them as “las malinches”—traitors to established Mexican codes of chaperoned feminine conduct.” In general, the Pachucos were praised in community for taking a stand against the Anglos, but the Pachucas were frequently criticized in media and in community  for being so open about their sexuality, and new found social and political identities within American society.

Amelia Venegas, a Mexican American woman and later considered a cholita, was arrested for disturbing the peace and carrying a concealed weapon after cursing at police officials. According to the press, "twenty-two-year-old, mother of a toddler and wife of a sailor, had incited violence by urging a gang of pachucos to attack sheriff's deputies in her East Los Angeles neighborhood." Additionally, newspapers reported that she “attempted to smuggle a pair of brass knuckles to "zoot suit hoodlums" to assist them in their street brawls with sailors.” The Los Angeles Times  featured a photograph of her baring teeth and shaking a threatening fist at the  camera. The press deemed Venegas a "pachuco" girl,  a label that then suggested gang  affiliation.

In the community 
Las Pachucas faced much backlash from their own Mexican American community.  Specifically, the  Pachuca, became a  contested figure in the Mexican  American community during the time of the riots and WWII. Some  women admired and wore the style, creating their own identities within the American culture and feminist movements.  However, others like Patricia Adler, an Anglo female historian, saw them as dangerous and disruptive to the ideal Mexican American womanhood, something that was developing in comparison to Anglo feminism ideals. Adler commented that Pachucas “scandalized the adults of the Anglo and Mexican communities alike with their short, tight skirts, sheer blouses, and built-up hairdos”. Many women felt this way, because las pachucas and the wearing of the suit was associated with delinquency and rebelled against proper feminine behavior and definitions of Mexican femininity.

In History 
Within the Mexican American History Pachucas were excluded, this led to the minimization of their role within the Chicano movement.

In art 
Carmen Lomas Garza's Pachuca With a Razor Blade is a "portrait of teenagers getting dressed for a dance with one young woman concealing a razor blade in a barrette, no doubt, to be hip and protected".  As far as the razor blade concealed in a barrette, protection for young women were of the utmost importance, especially during a time of increased violence and racism toward Mexican Americans.

In the Southwest

In Arizona Pre-WWII 
Early Pachucas/os in Pre-WW2 were not recognized for their actions or their looks but rather their language, their use of calo was the main signifier for them as Cumming states that the, "early pachuco identity was manifested in linguistic practice." Pre WW2 pachucas dressed the same as their peers the main signifiers being tall hairstyles such as the “pompadour” or high rolls in which, much like the pachucas of Los Angeles, they often hid knives. Unlike their later Los Angeles counterparts Tucson Pachucas did not seem to take to gang life other than simply being aggressive- as shown from their moto “no dejarse” which “describes a strategy of not allowing oneself to be treated unfairly or badly”- and hanging out in groups with their friends. The real difference was the tattoo of a small cross that Pachucas often wore clearly distinguishing them from their Los Angeles counterparts.

Style 
After WWII the Tucson Pachucas style evolved with the times. They still spoke calo, wore tattoos, put their hair up high, wore short skirts, a “blouse and the oxford shoes, black and white, with the white socks”, bell bottoms and hip-huggers. They teased their hair up higher into a beehive, they wore heavy makeup, and continued to hang out in club-like “gangs” which they gave names like “Copper Queens”. They continued to use no dejarse as their moto and portray a “tough” demeanor.

Lifestyle 
As for lifestyle choices most Pachucas would party or cruise with their male counterparts. Most of the teenagers within the Pachuco culture would drive fast cars and drink alcohol. While only some were able to attend house parties that were not chaperoned, Pachuca’s would rarely be seen at one of those unchaperoned house parties. The women were never able to attend parties due to the strict rules set by their families and overall community. Teenagers would drive over and hang out with friends while they drank alcohol and played the guitar. Roughly any fights broke out, their time together during these parties was to just be together and have fun. On accounts they would drink in the desert, and the girls would accompany guys in their cars for parties to impress other individuals.

Problems with the Education System and Portrayal in Media 
In places such as Tucson, Arizona up until the 1970s the schools were segregated. To combat the large immigrations numbers most government officials saw it necessary for public schools to conform to a national education policy. Over 50 percent of the children in school were Spanish speaking.

Since the start of the Zoot Suit Riots, articles of Pachuca’s started to be written as them being bloodthirsty. The Pachuca’s were described as manly and a danger to society. Those articles that were produced in Los Angeles caused a crisis for all Mexican American women in general. It left Mexican American women in the Southwest with a bad reputation, they were perceived as evil and cruel a bad stigma placed upon their heads as the riots grew. They were always known as dangerous, but now they would be ridiculed with derogatory remarks towards lesbianism and remarks at what clothing type they had. They had seen themselves as fierce and powerful, yet the media mocked them and portrayed them based on their appearances.

Mexican American women working in the borderlands 
Within the borderland regions Mexican American women were able to confide in themselves and express there need to support their families. Although society had trouble with the socioeconomic and political changes, the women who worked near the borderlands and the American Southwest held that sense of community and identity as they found support within their families.  While working it helped influence a woman’s role in the world. They were starting to be seen in the workforce and played a larger role within labor and society. This helped shape the development for woman around the border states and Southwest. Women were now being seen as an asset to society not only for their roles as a mother or a wife, but as a woman.

Cultural influence in Tucson
While in Los Angeles the youth subculture of Pachuco/as was clearly dominated by Chicana/os, Mexican American youth, this was not the case in Tucson where the Pachuca/o movement was made up of Chicana/o, Yaqui Indian and to some extent Apache Indian youth. Thus, native traditions, such as the small cross of protection that was placed on traditional Yaqui dance masks, made its way into the Pachuca tradition of tattooing a small cross either on the face or the hand. While specific placement is shown to have deeper meaning within the subculture it is not particularly elaborated on in the book.

References 

History of subcultures
Mexican-American culture
Mexican youth culture